The Director General of the National Crime Agency is the head of the National Crime Agency in the United Kingdom, and as such is responsible for the overall management of the NCA. The Director General is appointed by, and reports to, the Home Secretary, but is not directly part of the Home Office. The Director General is appointed on a five-year term basis, though this can be renewed (for another five-year term) or extended (for any period less than five years) at the Home Secretary's discretion.

As the Director General is in charge of a national agency with jurisdiction and investigative powers across the entire country, this post is considered to be the most senior police role in the United Kingdom, outranking the Commissioner of Police of the Metropolis, as the Director General has the power to direct any chief constables and commissioners. The Director General is supported by three Deputy Directors General, in charge of Operations, Capabilities, and Economic Crime.

The current Director General is Graeme Biggar, who was appointed following the medical retirement of Lynne Owens.

NCA Directors General

See also 

 Director General of MI5
 Commissioner of Police of the Metropolis

References

External links

National Crime Agency